Ticherra is a monotypic genus in the lycaenid or blues family. Its sole species is Ticherra acte, the blue imperial, a small butterfly found in India and South-East Asia.

Subspecies
Ticherra acte acte (Sikkim, Assam, Burma, Thailand, Cambodia)
Ticherra acte liviana Fruhstorfer, 1912 (southern Burma, Peninsular Malaya, Thailand, Sumatra)
Ticherra acte staudingeri (Druce, 1895) (Borneo)
Ticherra acte retracta Cowan, 1967 (Hainan)

See also
List of butterflies of India (Lycaenidae)

References
 
  
 
 
 
 

Cheritrini
Monotypic butterfly genera
Lycaenidae genera
Taxa named by Lionel de Nicéville